(Main list of acronyms)


 a – (s) Atto-
 A – (s) Ampere

A0–9
 A1C – Airman First Class
 A2ATD or A2ATD – (i) Anti-Armour Advanced Technology Demonstration
 A2C2 or A2C2 – (i) Army Airspace Command and Control
 A4 – many, including a European standard office paper size; see entry
 A10 – (i) Atlantic 10 Conference

AA
 aa – (s) Afar language (ISO 639-1 code)
 aA – (s) Attoampere
 AA
 (i) achieved availability
 Alcoholics Anonymous
 (s) Armed Forces Americas (postal symbol)
 Aruba (FIPS 10-4 territory code)
 (i) assembly area
 Automobile Association
 avenue of approach
 American Airlines
 Aerolíneas Argentinas
 AAA
 (i) administration, authorization, and authentication
 American Automobile Association ("Triple-A")
 anti-aircraft artillery
 Amateur Athletic Association (of England)
 Asistencia Asesoría y Administración (Spanish, "Assistance, Consulting, and Administration" — original name of Mexican professional wrestling promotion Lucha Libre AAA Worldwide)
 AAAI – (i) Association for the Advancement of Artificial Intelligence, formerly American Association for Artificial Intelligence
 AAAS – (i) American Association for the Advancement of Science
 AAAV – (i) Advanced Amphibious Assault Vehicle
 AABN – (i) African Aurora Business Network
 AABP – (i) American Association of Bovine Practitioners
 AAC
 (i) American Athletic Conference
 Army Air Corps (British Army)
 AACL – (i) Albanian American Civic League
 AACCS – (i) American Association of Christian Colleges and Seminaries
 AAD
 (i) analogue-analogue-digital (CD quality)
 Australian Antarctic Division
 AADD – Adult attention deficit disorder
 AADT – (i) annual average daily traffic
 AADAC – (a) Alberta Alcohol and Drug Abuse Commission
 AADC
 (i) area air defense commander
 (i) amino acid decarboxylase
 (i) aromatic L-amino acid decarboxylase
 (i) Australian Antarctic Data Centre
 AAFC
 (i) U.S. Army Air Corps Ferrying Command (1941–1942)
 All-America Football Conference (1946–1949)
 AAFES – (i) Army and Air Force Exchange Service
 AAI – (i) applied artificial intelligence
 AAIS – (i) advanced airborne interceptor simulator
 AAM – (i) air-to-air missile
 AAMOF – (i) as a matter of fact
 AAN – (i) American Academy of Nursing
 AANEAS – (a) Anglo-Australian Near-Earth Asteroid Survey
 AAODL – (i) Atmospheric Aerosols and Optics Data Library
 a.a.p. – (i) Associated Artists Productions (former film distributor)
 AAP
 (i) advanced acquisition plan
 Allied administrative publication
 American Academy of Pediatrics
 AAPC – (i) Accounting and Auditing Policy Committee
 aar – (s) Afar language (ISO 639-2 code)
 AAR
 (i) after-action review
 Association of American Railroads
 AARP – (i/s) American Association of Retired Persons (now officially known only by the initials)
 AAS
 (i) Advanced Automation System
 American Astronomical Society ("double-A-S")
 AASPEM – (i) advanced air-to-air system performance evaluation model
 AAT – (i) Australian Antarctic Territory
 AAV – (i) Amphibious Assault Vehicle
 AAWC – (i) anti-air warfare commander

AB
 ab – (s) Abkhaz language (ISO 639-1 code)
 AB
 (i) Able Seaman (both the rank and the occupation)
 (s) Alberta (postal symbol)
 ABA
 (i) Adriatic Basketball Association
 American Bar Association
 American Basketball Association
 American Beverage Association
 American Bicycle Association
 American Birding Association
 Australian Broadcasting Authority
 ABB – (i) ASEA Brown Boveri (Swiss-Swedish multinational company)
 ABBA – (a) Agnetha, Benny, Björn, Anni-Frid (Swedish pop group)
 ABC
 (i) abstinence, be faithful, condoms
 Active Body Control
 airway, breathing, circulation (see CPR)
 Alcoholic Beverage Commission
 alien big cat
 always be careful
 American Bird Conservancy
 American-born Chinese
 American Broadcasting Company
 anti-lock brake controller
 Associated British Cinemas
 ABC Cinemas
 ABC Weekend TV (Associated British Cinemas (Television) Ltd / ABC Television Ltd)
 Associated British Corporation (ABC Television Films Ltd)
 Atanasoff–Berry Computer
 Atlantic Baptist College
 atomic, biological, chemical (see NBC)
 Australian Broadcasting Corporation
 already been chewed gum
 ABCA
 (i) American, British and Canadian Armies (originally)
 Army Bureau of Current Affairs
 ABCS – (i) (U.S.) Army Battle Command System
 ABET – (a) Accreditation Board for Engineering and Technology
 ABFIST – (i) Advanced Bradley Full Crew Interactive Skills Trainer
 ABGI – (i) Addington-Barker Group International
 ABIN – (a) Agência Brasileira de Inteligência (Brazilian Intelligence Agency)
 abk – (s) Abkhaz language (ISO 639-2 code)
 ABL – (i) American Basketball League
 ABLE – (a) AirBorne Law Enforcement (police air support unit)
 ABM – (i) anti-ballistic missile – Asynchronous Balanced Mode – automated banking machine
 ABMC – (i) American Battle Monuments Commission
 ABN 
 (i) Australian Business Number (a number issued by the Australian government as registration of a business and used for taxation purposes)
 Advance Beneficiary Notice of Non-coverage (a form used in health insurance)
 ABPI – (i) Association of the British Pharmaceutical Industry
 ABRSM – (a) Associated Board of the Royal Schools of Music
 ABS
 (i) acrylonitrile butadiene styrene
 anti-lock braking system
 ABSA – (a) Amalgamated Banks of South Africa ("ab-sa")
 ABSTRIPS – (p) abstraction-based STRIPS
 ABV – (i) Alcohol by volume
 ABW – (s) Aruba (ISO 3166 trigram)

AC
 aC – (s) Attocoulomb
 Ac – (s) Actinium
 AC
 (i) Adriamycin-Cyclophosphamide (chemotherapy)
 Air Conditioning
 Aircraftman
 Alternating Current
 Altocumulus
 ante Christum (Latin, "before Christ"; see BC)
 ante cibum (Latin, "before meals")
 (s) Antigua and Barbuda (FIPS 10-4 country code)
 (i) Associazione Calcio (Italian, "football (soccer) club")
 A/C – (i) Air Conditioned/Conditioning – Aircraft
 AC1 – Aircraftman 1st Class
 AC2 – Aircraftman 2nd Class
 ACA
 Affordable Care Act, shorthand for the Patient Protection and Affordable Care Act, commonly called "Obamacare"
 (i) Airspace Control Authority
 Airspace Co-ordination Area
 A Current Affair
 ACAB, short for "All Cops Are Bastards"; used as a political slogan associated with dissidents who are opposed to the police.
 ACARS – (a) Aircraft Communications Addressing and Reporting System
 ACAS
 (a) Aboriginal Children's Advancement Society
 Advisory, Conciliation and Arbitration Service
 ACB – (i) Asociación de Clubes de Baloncesto (Spanish for "Association of Basketball Clubs")
 ACC
 (i) U.S. Air Combat Command
 Air Component Commander
 Alpine Club of Canada
 Altocumulus castellanus
 Area control center
 Atlantic Coast Conference
 Automatic climate control
 ACCA
 (i) The Association of Chartered Certified Accountants
 Automatic Cloud Cover Assessment
 ACCAC – (a) Awdurdod Cymwysterau, Cwricwlwm ac Asesu Cymru (Qualifications, Curriculum and Assessment Authority for Wales)
 ACCD – American Coalition of Citizens with Disabilities
 ACCS – (i) Air Communications and Control Squadron
 ACDA – (i) Arms Control & Disarmament Agency
 ACDC
 (i) Alternating Current Direct Current
 the name of an Australian rock music band
 a term for a bisexual person
 A/Cdre – Air Commodore
 ACDT
 (a) Apple Certified Desktop Technician
 (a) Australian Central Daylight Time
 ACE
 (a) Air Combat Emulator (computer game)
 Allied Command Europe
 Angiotensin-converting enzyme
 Armored Combat Earthmover
 Automatic Computing Engine
 ACE2 – (i/p) Angiotensin-converting enzyme 2 (pronounced "ace-two")
 ACES
 (a) Aerolíneas Centrales de Colombia (Spanish, "Central Colombian Airlines")
 Auxiliary Campus Enterprises and Services of Alfred State College
 ACF
 (i) Administration for Children and Families
 American Car and Foundry
 American Culinary Federation
 ACH – (i) Automated clearing house
 ACHT – (i) Average Call Hold Time
 ACID – (a) Atomicity, Consistency, Isolation, and Durability (in databases)
 ACINT – (p) Acoustic Intelligence
 ACK – (p) Acknowledge (telecommunications; cf. NAK)
 ACL
 (i) Access Control List
 Anterior cruciate ligament; the initialism can also refer to an injury to this ligament
 Atlantic Coast Line Railroad
 ACLJ – (i) American Center for Law and Justice
 ACLOS – (i) Automatic CLOS (missile control system)
 ACLS – (i) American Council of Learned Societies
 ACLU
 (i) American Civil Liberties Union
 American Communist Lawyers Union (pejorative slang for the above)
 ACM – many, including Association for Computing Machinery; see entry
 ACMC – (i) (U.S.) Assistant Commandant of the Marine Corps
 ACN
 (i) Airborne Communications Node
 Australian Company Number (number issued by the Australian government as registration of a limited liability company)
 ACNA – (i) Anglican Church in North America
 ACO – (i) Airspace Control Order
 ACOBA – (a) Advisory Committee on Business Appointments
 ACOG – (a) American College of Obstetricians and Gynecologists
 ACOM – (p) (U.S.) Atlantic Command
 ACORN – (a) Association of Community Organizations for Reform Now
 ACP
 (i) African, Caribbean and Pacific Group of States
 Air Control Point
 ACR – (i) Advanced Concepts and Requirements
 ACRI – (p) African Crisis Response Initiative
 ACRT – (i) Advanced Concepts Research Tool simulator
 ACS
 (i) Affiliated Computer Services (NYSE ACS)
 Alaska Communications Service
 American Cancer Society
 American Chemical Society
 Association of Caribbean States
 Australian Computer Society
 ACSC – (i) Army Command and Staff College (various nations)
 ACST – (i) Australian Central Standard Time
 ACST – (i) American Cooperative School of Tunis
 ACT
 (i) Adaptive Control of Thought (cognitive model)
 American College Test (ing Program)
 Australian Capital Territory (also postal symbol)
 ACT UP – (a) AIDS Coalition to Unleash Power
 ACTD – (i) Advanced Concept Technology Demonstration
 ACTF
 (i) (U.S.) Army Constructive Training Federation
 Australian Children's Television Foundation
 ACT-R – (i) ACT-Rational (cognitive model)
 ACT-R/PM – (i) ACT-R/Perceptual-Motor (cognitive model)
 ACTU – (i) Australian Council of Trade Unions
 ACU
 (i) Abilene Christian University
 American Conservative Union
 ACUF
 (i) BGN Advisory Committee on Undersea Features
 (a) American Conservative Union Foundation
 ACV – (i) Armoured Combat Vehicle

AD
 AD – (i) Air Defence – (s) Andorra (ISO 3166 digram) – (i) Anno Domini (Latin, "In the year of our Lord")
 A/D – (i) Analog/Digital
 ADA
 (i) Air Defence Artillery
 American Dental Association
 Assistant District Attorney
 Americans with Disabilities Act (see also the similar but non-acronymic Ada programming language)
 ADA Cryptocurrency token for Cardano blockchain
 ADAC – (a/i) Allgemeiner Deutscher Automobil-Club (German, "General German Automobile Club")
 ADAGE – (a) Air Defense Air to Ground Engagement (simulation)
 ADAP – (i) AIDS Drug Assistance Program
 ADAS – (a/i) Asiago-DLR Asteroid Survey
 ADAT – (i) Alesis Digital Audio Tape (recording format)
 ADatP – (p) Automated Data Processing
 ADATS –
 (i) Agricultural Development and Training Society
 Air Defence Anti-Tank System
 Australian Defence Air Traffic System
 ADB – (i) Asian Development Bank
 ADB- All da best/All the best - texting slang 
 ADC – 
 (i) Aide De Camp
 U.S. Air Defense Command (1946–1992)
 Apple Display Connector
 Program Against Digital Counterfeiting of Currency
 ADCTS – (i) Advanced Distributed Combat Training System
 ADD – 
 (i) Analog Digital Digital (CD quality)
 Attention-Deficit Disorder
 Administration on Developmental Disabilities
 ADDIE – (i) Analyze Design Develop Implement and Evaluate
 ADDNS – (i) Advanced Deployable Day/Night Simulation
 ADE
 (i) Algebraic differential equation
 Antibody-dependent enhancement
 ADF
 (i) Australian Defence Force
 African Development Foundation
 ADGB – Air Defence of Great Britain
 ADHD – (i) Attention-Deficit Hyperactivity Disorder
 ADHS – (i) Attention-Deficit Hyperactivity Syndrome
 ADI – (i) Acceptable/Allowable Daily Intake
 ADIZ – (a/i) Air Defence Identification Zone
 ADL – (i) Anti-Defamation League
 ad loc. – (p) ad locum (Latin, "to/at the place")
 ADM – 
 (i) Administrative
 (s) Admiral, and the U.S. Public Health Service Commissioned Corps
 Archer Daniels Midland
 Assistant Deputy Minister
 ADOA – (a/i) Air Defence Operations Area
 ADP – 
 (i) Adenosine DiPhosphate
 Army Doctrine Publication (UK, Canada, Australia)
 Automatic/Automated Data Processing
 ADRG – (p) Arc-second Raster Chart (ARC) Digitized Raster Graphics
 ADS –
 (a/i) Active Denial System
 Astrophysics Data System
 Attention Deficit Syndrome
 ADSR – (i) Attack, Decay, Sustain, Release (sound envelope specification)
 ADT
 (i) Abu Dhabi Terminals, operator of commercial ports in Abu Dhabi
 American District Telegraph, a former name of ADT Inc.
 Atlantic Daylight Time (UTC−3 hours)
 ADTB – (i) Army Doctrine and Training Bulletin
 adv. – (p) adversus (Latin, "against")
 ADW – (i) Air Defence Warning

AE
 ae – (s) Avestan language (ISO 639-1 code)
 AE
 (s) Armed Forces Africa/Canada/Europe/Middle East (postal symbol)
 United Arab Emirates (ISO 3166 digram; FIPS 10-4 country code)
 (i) Artix Entertainment
 American Eagle
 A&E
 (a/i) Arts & Entertainment Network, the original name for the U.S. TV channel now known as A&E Network
 Accident and Emergency
 AEB – Autonomous Emergency Braking, see Collision avoidance system
 AED – (s) United Arab Emirates dirham (ISO 4217 currency code)
 AEDT – (a) Australian Eastern Daylight Time
 AEF – (i) American Expeditionary Force
 AEGIS – (p) Airborne Early warning Ground environment Interface Segment (fake etymology)
 AEI-T – (i) Army Enterprise Infostructure-Transport
 aeq. – (p) aequalis (Latin, "equal")
 AESR – (i) Aeronautical Equipment Service Record
 AEST – (a) Australian Eastern Standard Time
 aet. – (p) aetatis (Latin, "of age", "aged")
 aet – (i) After extra time (Football)
 AEW
 (i) Air Expeditionary Wing
 (i) Airborne early warning
 (i) Airborne electronic warfare
 (i) All Elite Wrestling (US professional wrestling promotion)

AF
 af – (s) Afrikaans language (ISO 639-1 code)
 aF – (s) Attofarad
 AF
 (s) Afghanistan (FIPS 10-4 country code; ISO 3166 digram)
 (i) Air Force
 As fuck
 AFA
 (i) U.S. Air Force Academy
 Asociación del Fútbol Argentino (Spanish, "Argentine Football Association")
 AFAIC – (i) As Far As I'm Concerned
 AFAICT – (i) As Far As I Can Tell
 AFAIK – (i) As Far As I Know
 AFAIR – (i) As Far As I Remember/Recall
 AFAM
 (i/a) Associazione Friulana di Astronomia e Meteorologia (Italian, "Friuli Association of Astronomy and Meteorology")
 (p) Department of African and Afro-American Studies, University of North Carolina at Chapel Hill — notable for its links to the school's academic-athletic scandal in the 2010s
 AFATDS – (i) Advanced Field Artillery Tactical Data System
 AFC
 (i) American Football Conference
 Approved for construction
 Asian Football Confederation
 AFCEA – (i) Armed Forces Communications and Electronics Association
 AfD
 (i) Allianz für Deutschland ("Alliance for Germany"), former political alliance in East Germany
 Alternative für Deutschland ("Alternative for Germany"), current German political party
 AFD
 (i) Active Format Description, a technical standard for TV or set-top box decoders
 Advanced Format Drive, a type of computing storage device
 Adjustable-frequency drive
 Adult Film Database, web-based database of adult cinema
 Agence française de développement ("French Development Agency"), a French international development agency
 Alliance des forces démocratiques (French; "Alliance of Democratic Forces"), an Ivorian political alliance
 Alliance for Freedom and Democracy, an Eritrean political party
 AFDB – (i) African Development Bank
 AFES – (i) Automatic Fire Extinguishing System
 AFG – (s) Afghanistan (ISO 3166 trigram)
 AFGAM – (i) Amazon Facebook Google Apple Microsoft
 AFI
 (s) French Territory of the Afars and Issas (ISO 3166 trigram; obsolete since 1977)
 (i) "Agencia Federal de Investigaciónes" (México)
 AFIS
 (a) Automated Fingerprint Identification System
 American Forces Information Service
 AFIST – (i) Abrams Full Crew Interactive Skills Trainer
 AFJ – (i) April Fool's Joke
 AFK – (i) Away From Keyboard (Internet chat abbreviation)
 AFL
 (i) American Federation of Labor
 American Football League — either the 1960s league that merged into the National Football League, or one of several other leagues of American football
 Arena Football League
 Australian Football League
 AFL–CIO – (i) American Federation of Labor – Congress of Industrial Organizations
 AFLAC – (a) American Family Life Assurance Company of Columbus
 AFM – (i) Army Field Manual (UK; the U.S. more frequently uses just FM) – Atomic Force Microscope – Aviation Fleet Maintenance
 AFN – (s) Afghani (ISO 4217 currency code)
 AFO – (i) Association of Field Ornithologists
 AFOSR – (i) U.S. Air Force Office of Scientific Research
 AFP
 (i) Agence France-Presse (French, "French Press Agency")
 Australian Federal Police
 AFQT – (i) Armed Forces Qualification Test
 afr – (s) Afrikaans language (ISO 639-2 code)
 AFRC – (i) Air Force Reserve Command
 AFRL – (i) Air Force Research Laboratory
 AFROTC – (i) Air Force Reserve Officer Training Corps
 AFRRI – (i, U.S.) Armed Forces Radiobiology Research Institute
 AFRTS – (i) Armed Forces Radio and Television Service
 AFS
 (i) Active Front Steering
 Air Facility Sub-System
 Amniotic Fluid-derived Stem cell
 AFS&A or AFSA – (i) U.S. Air Force Studies and Analysis
 AFSC
 (i) U.S. Air Force Staff College (obsolete; replaced by JFSC)
 U.S. Air Force Systems Command
 AFSCN – (i) U.S. Air Force Satellite Control Network
 AFSPC – (i) Air Force Space Command
 AFT – American Farmland Trust
 AFV – (i) armoured fighting vehicle
 AFWA
 (a) Air Force Weather Agency
 Association of Fish and Wildlife Agencies

AG
 ag – (s) Attogram
 Ag – (s) Silver (Latin argentum)
 AG
 (i) air gunner
 Aktiengesellschaft (German, "incorporated")
 (s) Algeria (FIPS 10-4 country code)
 Antigua and Barbuda (ISO 3166 digram)
 Assemblies of God
 AGA
 (a/i) AB Gas-accumulator ("ah-gah", Swedish company)
 Advanced Graphics Architecture
 AGARD – (a) Advisory Group for Aerospace Research and Development
 AGARDograph – (p) Advanced Guidance for Alliance Research and Development publication
 AGASA – (a) Akeno Giant Air Shower Array (cosmic ray detector)
 AGB – (i) Internal Nintendo initialism (Advanced Game Boy) for Game Boy Advance
 AGC
 (i) Apollo Guidance Computer
 Automatic Gain Control
 AGC – (i) Adjutant General's Corps (British Army)
 AGDC – (i) Australian Game Developers' Conference
 AGI – (i) Auxiliary Group Intelligence
 AGL – (i) Above Ground Level
 AGM – (i) Annual General Meeting
 AGN – (i) Active Galactic Nucleus
 AGO – (s) Angola (ISO 3166 trigram)
 AGP – (i) Accelerated Graphics Port
 AGRICOLA – (a) Agriculture Online Access
 AGS – (i) Alaska Ground Station (LandSat)
 AGTS – (i) Advanced Gunnery Training System
 AGU – (i) American Geophysical Union
 AGW – (i) Autonomous Guided Weapon

AH
 aH – (s) Attohenry
 Ah – (s) Ampere hour
 AH – (i) Attack Helicopter
 AHA – (i) American Heart Association
 AHCPR – (i) Agency for Health Care Policy and Research (obsolete; replaced with AHRQ)
 AHEC – (i) Australian Health Ethics Committee
 AHPCRC – (i) Army High Performance Computing Research Center
 AHQ – Air Headquarters
 AHRQ – (i) Agency for Healthcare Research and Quality
 AHS – (i)	American Housing Survey

AI
 AI
 (i) Air Interdiction
 Amnesty International
 Artificial Insemination
 Artificial Intelligence
 (s) Anguilla (ISO 3166 digram)
 AIA
 (i) Aerospace Industries Association
 American Institute of Architects
 (s) Anguilla (ISO 3166 trigram)
 AIAA – (i) American Institute of Aeronautics and Astronautics
 AIC
 (i) African Independent Church
 Animal Identification Coordinator
 AICD – (i) Australian Institute of Company Directors
 AICMFP – (i) And I Claim My Five Pounds
 AID – (i) U.S. Agency for International Development
 AIDS – (a) Acquired Immune Deficiency Syndrome
 AIHW – Australian Institute of Health and Welfare
 AIM – many, including AOL Instant Messenger, Australian Institute of Management; see entry
 AIMP – (i) Aurora Incremental Modernization Project
 AIPAC – (i) American Israel Public Affairs Committee
 AIR – (i) Aircraft Inventory Record
 AIRFA – (a) American Indian Religious Freedom Act
 AIRS – (a/i) Aerometric Information Retrieval System (obsolete; replaced with AFS)
 AIS
 (i) Australian Institute of Sport
 Automatic Identification System
 AISB – (i) (British) Society for the Study of Artificial Intelligence and the Simulation of Behaviour

AJ
 aJ – (s) Attojoule
 AJ – (s) Azerbaijan (FIPS 10-4 country code)
 Ajax – (a) Asynchronous JavaScript And XML
 AJD – (i) Astronomical Julian day
 AJP – (i) Allied Joint Publication
 AJPW – (i) All Japan Pro Wrestling

AK
 ak – (s) Akan languages (ISO 639-1 code)
 aK – (s) Attokelvin
 AK – (s) Alaska (postal symbol)
 aka – (s) Akan languages (ISO 639-2 code)
 a.k.a. – (i) Also known as (i.e.: alias)
 AKA – (i) Above knee amputation (orthopaedic usage)
 AKDT – (p) Alaska Standard Daylight Saving Time (UTC−8 hours)
 AKST – (p) Alaska Standard Time (UTC−9 hours)
 AKP – (i) Adalet ve Kalkınma Partisi (Turkish, "Justice and Development Party")

AL
 aL – (s) Attolitre
 Al – (s) Aluminium
 AL
 (s) Alabama (postal symbol)
 Albania (FIPS 10-4 country code; ISO 3166 digram)
 (i) Anno Lucis (Latin, "Year of Light", in Masonic tradition, most often seen on plaques bearing the founding dates of buildings, in years AD and years AL)
 ALA – (s) Åland (ISO 3166 trigram)
 ALAP – (a) As Long/Late As Possible
 ALARM – (a) Air-Launched Anti-Radar Missile
 ALB – (s) Albania (ISO 3166 trigram)
 ALCOA or Alcoa – The Aluminum Company of America, NYSE:AA
 ALD – (i) Accounting Line Designator (nuclear weapon targeting)
 ALERT – (a) Advanced Linked Extended Reconnaissance and Targeting – Attack and Launch Early Reporting to Theatre
 ALF
 (a) Africa Leadership Forum
 Alien Life Form (cf. ALF (TV series))
 Animal Liberation Front
 ALG – (s) Algeria (IOC and FIFA trigram, but not ISO 3166)
 ALGOL – (p) ALGOrithmic Language
 ALL – (s) Albanian lek (ISO 4217 currency code)
 ALOA – (i) Associated Locksmiths of America, Inc.
 ALOC
 (a) Air Lines Of Communication
 (a) Average Length of Calls
 ALP – (i) Australian Labor Party
 ALPA – (a) Air Line Pilots Association
 ALS – (i) Amyotrophic Lateral Sclerosis – Automatic Landing System
 ALSHS – (a) Abraham Low Self-Help Systems
 ALSP – (i) Aggregate Level Simulation Protocol
 ALTE – (a) Association of Language Testers in Europe
 ALTACS – (p) Automated decision Logic Tactical Air Combat Simulation

AM
 am
 (s) Amharic language (ISO 639-1 code)
 Attometre
 Am – (s) Americium
 AM
 many, including Amplitude Modulation and Ante Meridiem; see entry
 (s) Armenia (FIPS 10-4 country code; ISO 3166 digram)
 AM1 – Airman 1st class
 AMA
 (i) American Medical Association
 Australian Medical Association
 AMAPS – (a) Aircraft, Missile, Avionics Performance Simulation
 AMC
 (i) Adaptive modulation and coding (digital communications)
 U.S. Air Mobility Command
 American Motors Corporation
 American Movie Classics (TV network; now known simply by the initials)
 U.S. Army Materiel Command
 AMCB – (i) U.S. Army/Marine Corps Board
 AMD
 (i) Advanced Micro Devices
 Age-related Macular Degeneration
 (s) Armenian dram (ISO 4217 currency code)
 AMF – (i) Afghan Military Force(s)
 AMFOM – (i) Advanced Missile Fly Out Model ("am-fomm")
 AMFR
 (i) Age-specific Marital Fertility Rate
 Amplitude Modulation Following Response
 AMFRS
 (i) Advanced Multi-Function Radio Frequency System
 Automatic Multisensor Feature-based Recognition System
 amh – (s) Amharic language (ISO 639-2 code)
 AML – (i) Acute Myeloid Leukaemia
 AMLCD – (i) Active Matrix Liquid Crystal Display
 AMLO
 (i) Andrés Manuel López Obrador (Mexican politician)
 Anti-Money Laundering Office — separate government agencies in Taiwan and Thailand 
 AMO – (i) Atlantic Multidecadal Oscillation
 AMOLED – (i) Active-matrix organic light-emitting diode
 AMOS
 (a) Advanced MOrtar System
 Air Force Maui Optical and Supercomputing observatory
 AMP
 (i) Adenosine MonoPhosphate
 Automated Mission Planner
 Anak ng Puta
 (i) Ain't My Problem
 AMRAAM – (a) Advanced Medium-Range Air-to-Air Missile
 AMRDEC – (i) U.S. Aviation & Missile Research, Development, & Engineering Center
 AMS
 (i) Agriculture Marketing Service
 American Mathematical Society
 AMSAA – (i/a) U.S. Army Materiel Systems Analysis Activity
 AMSB – (i) Aix Maurienne Savoie Basket (French basketball club)
 AMSO – (i/a) U.S. Army Model and Simulation Office
 AMSU – Advanced Microwave Sounding Unit
 AMTE – (i) UK Admiralty Marine Technology Establishment (1977–1984)

AN
 an – (s) Aragonese language (ISO 639-1 code)
 aN – (s) Attonewton
 AN
 (s) Andorra (FIPS 10-4 country code)
 Netherlands Antilles (ISO 3166 digram)
 ANA
 (i) Administration for Native Americans
 Afghan National Army
 All Nippon Airways
 Anti-Nuclear Anti-body
 (a) Australian National Airways
 Australian Natives' Association
 ANC – (i) African National Congress
 AND – (s) Andorra (ISO 3166 trigram)
 ANFO – (i) Ammonium nitrate/fuel oil (explosive)
 ANG
 (i) Air National Guard
 (s) Angola (IOC and FIFA trigram, but not ISO 3166)
 (s) Netherlands Antillian guilder (ISO 4217 currency code)
 ANGLiCo – (p) Air/Naval Gunfire Liaison Company
 ANL – (i) Argonne National Laboratory
 ANM – (i) Acoustic Noise Monitor
 ANOVA – (p) ANalysis Of VAriance
 ANS – (i) Applied and Natural Sciences
 ANSI – (a) American National Standards Institute
 ANTM – (i) America's Next Top Model
 ANT
 (s) Netherlands Antilles (ISO 3166 trigram)
 Antigua and Barbuda (IOC trigram, but not ISO 3166 or FIFA)
 ANTY – Acronyms, No Thank You
 ANWR – (i) Arctic National Wildlife Refuge 
 ANZ – (s) Australia and New Zealand Banking Group
 ANZAC – (a) Australian and New Zealand Army Corps

AO
 AO
 (s) Angola (FIPS 10-4 country code; ISO 3166 digram)
 (i) Approach Officer (submarine)
 Area of Operations
 AOA
 (i) Air Officer in charge of Administration
 Argonne National Laboratory
 (s) Angolan kwanza (ISO 4217 currency code)
 (i) Award of Arms (heraldry)
 Angle of Attack (fluid dynamics)
 AOC
 (i) Air Operations Centre
 Air Officer Commanding
 Alexandria Ocasio-Cortez (American politician)
 AOC in C – Air Officer Commanding in Chief
 AOD – (i) Adrenalin O.D. (punk rock band)
 AOE – Area of Effect
 AOI
 (i) Angle of Incidence
 Arab Organization for Industrialization
 AOL – (i) America OnLine
 AOR – (i) Area of Responsibility
 AOSTH – (i) Adventures of Sonic the Hedgehog
 AOTS – (i) Attack of the Show!
 AOU – (i) American Ornithologists' Union

AP
 AP
 (i) Advanced Placement
 Air Publication
 (s) Andhra Pradesh (Indian state code)
 (s) Armed Forces Pacific (postal symbol)
 (i) Associated Press
 Auto Pilot
 APA –
 (i) Acolytes Protection Agency (professional wrestling tag team)
 American Psychiatric Association
 American Psychological Association (see also APA style, a writing format developed by this body)
 APB – (i) All Points Bulletin (police jargon)
 APC
 (i) Armoured Personnel Carrier
 Armour Piercing Capped (ammunition)
 APEC – (a) Asia Pacific Economic Cooperation
 APCNR – (i) Armour-Piercing, Composite Non-Rigid (ammunition)
 APCR – (i) Armour-Piercing, Composite Rigid (ammunition)
 APDS – (i) Armour-Piercing, Discarding-Sabot (ammunition)
 APEDS – (a) AMSAA Performance Estimates Data System
 APEX – (p) Applied Physics Express
 APFSDS – (i) Armour-Piercing, Fin-Stabilised, Discarding Sabot (ammunition)
 APHA – (i) American Public Health Association
 APHE – (i) Armour-Piercing, High Explosive (ammunition)
 APHIS – (a) Animal and Plant Health Inspection Service
 API – (i) Application Programming Interface
 APL
 (i) A Programming Language
 Acute Promyeloid Leukaemia
 Anti-Personnel Landmine
 Applied Physics Laboratory (Johns Hopkins University)
 APM – (i) Advanced Power Management
 APNP – Advanced Practice Nurse Prescriber
 APOD – (i) Aerial Port (Airport) Of Debarkation
 APOE – (i) Aerial Port (Airport) Of Embarkation
 APOLLO – (a) Apache Point Observatory Lunar Laser-ranging Operation
 APP – (i) Allied Procedural Publication
 APR – (i) Annual Percentage Rate
 APS
 (i) Advanced Photo System (cf. APS-C, an image sensor format based on the size of the original APS film frame) 
 American Physical Society
 Antiphospholipid Antibody Syndrome

AQ
 AQ
 (i) AdventureQuest
 (s) American Samoa (FIPS 10-4 territory code)
 Antarctica (ISO 3166 digram)
 (i) Automatic qualifier, a term used by U.S. sports media from 1998 to 2013 to refer to the six conferences whose champions automatically entered the now-defunct Bowl Championship Series of college football
 AQIM – (i) Al-Qaeda in the Islamic Maghreb
 AQPS – (i) Autre que pur-sang (French: "Other than Thoroughbred"), designation of a type of French racehorse

AR
 ar – (s) Arabic language (ISO 639-1 code)
 Ar – (s) Argon
 AR
 (s) Argentina (FIPS 10-4 country code; ISO 3166 digram)
 Arkansas (postal symbol)
 (i) ArmaLite Rifle (cf. ArmaLite AR-15 and AR-15 style rifle, both also referred to with the "AR" initialism)
 Armour
 (s) Arunachal Pradesh (Indian state code)
 ara – (s) Arabic language (ISO 639-2 code)
 ARAG – (a) Advanced Research and Assessment Group
 ARB – (i) Administrative Review Board
 ARBA – (a/i) Army Review Boards Agency
 ARC
 (i) Appalachian Regional Commission
 Arc-second Raster Chart
 (a) Association of Retarded Citizens, the original name of the organization now known as Arc of the United States
 (i) Athletics–Recreation Center, an indoor arena at Valparaiso University
 ARCA – (a) Automobile Racing Club of America
 ARCENT – (p) United States Army Central Command
 ARDA – (a) Advanced Research and Development Activity (became DTO 2006)
 ARE
 (i) UK Admiralty Research Establishment (1984–1991)
 (s) United Arab Emirates (ISO 3166 trigram)
 ARF – (i) ASEAN Regional Forum
 arg – (s) Aragonese language (ISO 639-2 code)
 ARG – (s) Argentina (ISO 3166 trigram)
 ARH – (s) Armed Reconnaissance Helicopter
 ARI
 (i) Acute Respiratory Infection
 U.S. Army Research Institute for the Behavioral and Social Sciences
 ARL
 (i) UK Admiralty Research Laboratory (1921–1977)
 U.S. Army Research Laboratory
 UIUC Aviation Research Laboratory
 ARM
 (a) Acorn RISC Machine, later Advanced RISC Machine (cf. Arm Ltd.)
 Anti-Radiation Missile
 Adjustable-rate mortgage
 (s) Armenia (ISO 3166 trigram)
 ARNet – (p) Acquisition Reform Network
AROTS – Australian Rare Or Threatened Species
 ARP – (i) Address Resolution Protocol – Applied Research Programme
 ARPA – (a) Advanced Research Projects Agency
 ARRC – (i) ACE Rapid Reaction Corps
 ARRF – (i) Allied Rapid Reaction Force
 ARRL – (i) American Radio Relay League
 ARS
 (i) Agricultural Research Service
 (s) Argentine peso (ISO 4217 currency code)
 ARSC – (i) Arctic Region Supercomputing Center
 ARSPACE – (p) U.S. Army Space Command
 ART
 (a) Adaptive Resonance Theory
 Anti-Retroviral Therapy
 ARTCC – (i) Air Route Traffic Control Center
 ARWG – (i) Army Research Working Group ("are-wig")

AS
 as
 (i) Adult swim
 (s) Assamese language (ISO 639-1 code)
 Attosecond
 aS – (s) Attosiemens
 As – (s) Arsenic
 AS
 (s) American Samoa (postal symbol; ISO 3166 digram)
 Australia (FIPS 10-4 country code)
 Assam / Asom (Indian state code)
 AS – (i) ActionScript
 A/S – (i) Anti-submarine
 A&S – (i) Armament & Standardisation
 ASA
 (i) AcetylSalicylic Acid
 American Standards Association
 Army Security Agency
 Atlantic Southeast Airlines
 ASAP – (a) As Soon As Possible
 ASARS
 (a) Advanced Synthetic Aperture Radar System
 Airborne Search and Rescue System
 ASB – (i) Associated Student Body – Alternative Service Book (Church of England)
 asbl – (i) association sans but lucratif (French "Non-profit organisation")
 ASBO – (a) Antisocial Behavior Order
 ASCAP – (a) American Society of Composers, Authors, and Publishers
 ASCC
 (i) Army Service Component Commander
 Automatic Sequence Controlled Calculator
 Air Standardization Coordinating Committee
 ASCIET – (i) All Services Combat Identification Evaluation Team
 ASCII – (a) American Standard Code for Information Interchange
 ASC+T – (i) Anti Slip Control + Traction
 ASD
 (i) (U.S.) Assistant Secretary of Defense
 Autism spectrum disorder
 ASD(C3I) – (i) (U.S.) (Command, Control, Communications, & Intelligence)
 ASD(FMP) – (i) (U.S.) Assistant Secretary of Defense (Force Management Policy)
 ASD(HA) – (i) (U.S.) Assistant Secretary of Defense (Health Affairs)
 ASD(ISA) – (i) (U.S.) Assistant Secretary of Defense (International Security Affairs)
 ASD(ISP) – (i) (U.S.) Assistant Secretary of Defense (International Security Policy)
 ASD(LA) – (i) (U.S.) Assistant Secretary of Defense (Legislative Affairs)
 ASD(PA) – (i) (U.S.) Assistant Secretary of Defense (Public Affairs)
 ASD(RA) – (i) (U.S.) Assistant Secretary of Defense (Reserve Affairs)
 ASD(SO&HA) – (i) (U.S.) Assistant Secretary of Defense (Special Operations & Humanitarian Assistance)
 ASD(SO/LIC) – (i) (U.S.) (Special Operations & Low-Intensity Conflict)
 ASD(S&R) – (i) (U.S.) Assistant Secretary of Defense (Strategy & Requirements)
 ASD(S&TR) – (i) (U.S.) Assistant Secretary of Defense (Strategy & Threat Reduction)
 ASDIC – (a) Allied Submarine Detection Investigation Committee (Sonar)
 ASEAN – (a) Association of Southeast Asian Nations
 ASFAR – (a) Americans for a Society Free of Age Restrictions
 ASG – (i) Area Support Group
 ASIC – (a) Australian Securities & Investments Commission – (a) Aviation Security Identification Card
 ASICS – (a) Anima sana in corpore sano (Latin, "A sound mind in a sound body") (athletic shoe manufacturer)
 ASIO
 (a) Australian Security Intelligence Organisation
 Audio Stream Input/Output
 ASIP
 (i) Advanced System Improvement Program
 Army Stationing and Installation Plan
 Application-specific instruction set processor
 ASL
 (i) Above Sea Level
 American Sign Language (also known as Ameslan)
 "Age, Sex, Location?" (Internet slang)
 asm – (s) Assamese language (ISO 639-2 code)
 ASM
 (i) Air-to-Surface Missile
 (s) American Samoa (ISO 3166 trigram)
 (i) American Society for Metals
 American Society for Microbiology
 Association Sportive Montferrandaise (French, "Clermont-Ferrand Sporting Association"), as in ASM Clermont Auvergne
 ASMB
 (i) American Society for Matrix Biology
 Adult Swim Message Board
 ASME
 (i) American Society of Mechanical Engineers
 American Society of Magazine Editors
 ASMP
 (i) Air-Sol Moyenne Portée missile (French "Medium-range air to surface")
 (p) Asymmetric multiprocessing
 ASMR – Autonomous Sensory Meridian Response
 ASN – (i) Associate of Science in Nursing
 ASOC
 (a/i) Air Sovereignty Operations Centre
 Air Support Operations Centre
 Airport Security and Operations Centre
 Antarctic and Southern Ocean Coalition
 Atlanta Symphony Orchestra Chorus
 Australian Standard Offence Classification
 ASP
 (i) Active Server Pages
 American Society of Primatologists
 Ammunition Supply Point
 Application Service Provider (cf internet service provider)
 Astronomical Society of the Pacific
 Association of Surfing Professionals
 ASPI – (i) Australian Strategic Policy Institute
 ASR
 (i) Alkali-silica reaction
 Anti Slip Regulation
 ASRAAM – (a) Advanced Short-Range Air-to-Air Missile
 ASSC – (i) Association for the Scientific Study of Consciousness
 Ass Paym – Assistant Paymaster
 AST – (i) Atlantic Standard Time (UTC−4 hours)
 ASTIA – (a) Armed Services Technical Information Agency
 ASTM – (i) American Society for Testing and Materials
 ASTREA – (a) Aerial Support To Regional Enforcement Agencies (sheriff's air support unit)
 ASUN – (p) Atlantic Sun Conference, now branded as the ASUN Conference (pronounced "A-sun")
 ASUW – (p) AntiSUrface Warfare
 ASVAB–Armed Services Vocational Aptitude Battery (taken by juniors in high school in the USA)
 ASVEL – (a) Association Sportive Villeurbanne Éveil Lyonnais (Association Sportive is French for "Sporting Association"; the club was founded through the merger of AS Villeurbanne and Éveil Lyonnais)
 ASW – (i) AntiSubmarine Warfare
 ASWORG – (i) (U.S.) AntiSubmarine Warfare Operations Research Group
 ASX
 (p) Advanced Stream Redirector
 Australian Securities Exchange

AT
 aT – (s) Attotesla
 At – (s) Astatine
 AT – (i) Anti-Tank – (s) Ashmore and Cartier Islands (FIPS 10-4 territory code) – Austria (ISO 3166 digram) – (i) Advanced Technology (IBM Personal Computer/AT)
 ATA – (i) Advanced Technology Attachment (IBM Personal Computer) – Afghan Transitional Authority – Allen Telescope Array – (s) Antarctica (ISO 3166 trigram)
 ATAC – (a) Air Transportable Acoustic Communications
 ATACMS – (p) Army TACtical Missile System
 ATAPI – (a) Advanced Technology Attachment Packet Interface
 ATAS – (a) Air-To-Air Stinger (missile)
 ATAT – (a) Aiken Tactical Airsoft Team / Star Wars vehicle
 ATB
 (i) Active Time Battle
 (s) British Antarctic Territory (ISO 3166 trigram; merged with AQ in 1979)
 ATC –
 (i) Air Traffic Control
 Air Training Corps
 U.S. Air Transport Command (1942–1948)
 Athletic Trainer, Certified (www.nata.org)
 ATCCIS – (i) Army Tactical Command and Control Information System
 ATESS – (i) Aerospace and Telecommunications Engineering Support Squadron
 ATF
 (s) French Southern Territories (ISO 3166 trigram)
 (i) (U.S.) Bureau of Alcohol, Tobacco, Firearms and Explosives (from its previous name, which did not include "Explosives")
 ATG – (s) Antigua and Barbuda (ISO 3166 and FIFA trigram)
 ATGM – (i) Anti-Tank Guided Missile
 ATGW – (i) Anti-Tank Guided Weapon
 ATI –
 (i) Allied Telesyn International, Inc.
 (a) Array Technologies Incorporated. (ATI Technologies)
 Air Transport International - American cargo airline
 Atisbo – a Local Government Area in Nigeria named for constituent communities (Ago-Are, Tede, Irawo,  Sabe, Baasi, Ofiki and Owo)
 ATK – (p) Attack
 ATL – (p) Atlanta, Georgia, the largest city and capital of Georgia; taken from the IATA code for its airport
 ATLAS – 
 (a) All-Terrain Lifter Army System
 (p) Assessment Tool for LAnd Systems
 ATM – 
 (i) Automated Teller Machine
 Asynchronous Transfer Mode
 At The Moment
 ATN – (s) Dronning Maud Land (ISO 3166 trigram; merged with AQ in 1983)
 ATO
 (i) Air Tasking Order
 Australian Taxation Office
 ATP
 (i) Adenosine TriPhosphate
 Allied Tactical Publication
 Ammunition Transfer Point
 Association of Tennis Professionals (cf. ATP Tour, ATP Challenger Tour, ATP Champions Tour)
 ATSD – (p) (U.S.) Assistant Secretary of Defense
 ATSDR – (i) Agency for Toxic Substances and Disease Registry
 AT&T – (i) American Telephone and Telegraph (U.S. company, also known as "Ma Bell")
 ATV
 (i) All-terrain vehicle
 Associated Television – former UK TV company
 ATWA – (a) Air, Trees, Water, Animals

AU
 Au – (s) Gold (Latin Aurum)
 AU –
 (i) African Union (was OAU before 2000)
 American University
 (s) Astronomical Unit
 Australia (ISO 3166 diagram)
 Austria (FIPS 10-4 country code)
 AUC –
 (i) Ab Urbe Condita / Anno Urbis Conditae (Latin "from the founding of the city" / "in the year since the founding of the city") (of Rome)
 Area Under the Curve (concentration time curve; medicine)
 AUD – (s) Australian dollar (ISO 4217 currency code)
 AUS – (s) Australia (ISO 3166 trigram)
 AUSCANNZUKUS – (p) Australia, Canada, New Zealand, United Kingdom, United States (security designation)
 Auslan – (p) Australian Sign Language
 AUT – (s) Austria (ISO 3166 trigram)
 AUTL – (i) Army Universal Task List

AV
 av – (s) Avar language (ISO 639-1 code)
 aV – (s) Attovolt
 Av – (i) Aperture value (photographic mode)
 AV
 (s) Anguilla (FIPS 10-4 territory code)
 (i) Audio-Visual
 (s) Aviation
 ava – (s) Avar language (ISO 639-2 code)
 AVA – (i) American Viticultural Area
 AVB – (i) Audio Video Bridging
 AVCATT-A – (p) (U.S. Army's) Aviation Combed Arms Tactical Trainer-Aviation [Reconfigurable Manned Simulator]
 AVDLR – (p) Aviation Depot Level Repair
 ave – (s) Avestan language (ISO 639-2 code)
 AVGP – (i) Armoured Vehicle, General Purpose
 AVI – (i) Audio Video Interleave
 AVIM – (p) Aviation Intermediate Maintenance
 AVLB – (i) Armoured Vehicle Launched Body
 AVM
 (i) Air Vice-Marshal
 (p) Arteriovenous malformation
 AVO – (i) Apprehended Violence Order
 AVP – (a) Arubaanse Volkspartij
 AVP – (i) Association of Volleyball Professionals
 AVRE – (i) Armoured Vehicle Royal Engineers
 AVTB
 (i) Armoured Vehicle Test Bed
 (p) Aviation Test Bed
 AVUM – (p) Aviation Unit Maintenance
 AVUS – (a) Automobil-Verkehrs- und Übungsstraße (German, "Automobile Traffic and Training Road"; former auto racing track and current road in Berlin)
 AVVO – (a) Acute Vaginal Venereal Outbreak

AW
 aW – (s) Attowatt
 AW – (s) Aruba (ISO 3166 digram)
 AWA – (i) American Wrestling Association
 AWACS – (a) Airborne Warning And Control System
 AWC – (i) Air Warfare Centre
 AWD – many, including All Wheel Drive; see entry
 AWE – (i/a) Advanced Warfighting Experiment
 AWG – (s) Aruban guilder (ISO 4217 currency code)
 AWOL – (a) Absent Without Official Leave / Absent WithOut Leave (military jargon)
 AWP – (p) Awaiting Parts (SM&R code)
 AWSIM – (p) Air Warfare SIMulation
 AWST – (a) Australian Western Standard Time
 AWW – (i) Above-Water Warfare

AX
 AX – (s) Åland (ISO 3166 digram)
 AXP – (p) Ambulance eXchange Point

AY
 ay – (s) Aymara language (ISO 639-1 code)
 AY – (s) Antarctica (FIPS 10-4 territory code)
 AYBABTU – (i) All Your Base Are Belong To Us
 aym – (s) Aymara language (ISO 639-2 code)
 AYU – (i) As Yet Unknown

AZ
 az – (s) Azerbaijani language (ISO 639-1 code)
 AZ
 (s) Arizona (postal symbol)
 Azerbaijan (ISO 3166 digram)
 (i) Alkmaar Zaanstreek (Dutch football club)
 AZAL - Azerbaijan Airlines
 aze – (s) Azerbaijani language (ISO 639-2 code)
 AZE – (s) Azerbaijan (ISO 3166 trigram)
 AZN – (s) Azerbaijani manat (ISO 4217 currency code)
 AZUR – (p) Actions en zone urbaine (French, Urban Operations)

Acronyms A